Bohemian Manifesto: A Field Guide to Living on the Edge is a 2004 book written by Laren Stover and illustrated by IZAK  which details the eccentricities, peculiarities, and informalities of being a Bohemian. Stover uses prominent Bohemian artists' quotes and letters to describe the traditional lives of Bohemians, based on five  "class" types: Nouveau, Gypsy, Beat, Zen, and Dandy.

Bohemian types
Stover classifies Bohemians into five mindsets/styles. The Bohemian is "not easily classified like species of birds," writes Stover, noting there are crossovers and hybrids.

Nouveau Bohemian
The Nouveau Bohemian: This type of Bohemian harmonizes elements of traditional Bohemian ideology with contemporary culture without losing sight of the basic tenets—the glamour, art, and nonconformity. While Nouveaus may suffer poetically, artistically, and romantically, they have what appears to be, at first, one advantage over other Bohemians—the Nouveau has money.

Gypsy Bohemian
The Gypsy Bohemian: The expatriate types. They create their own Gypsy nirvana wherever they go. They are folksy flower children, hippies, psychedelic travelers, fairy folk, dreamers, Deadheads, Phish fans, medievalists, anachronistic throwbacks to a more romantic time...Gypsies scatter like seeds on the wind, don't own a watch, show up on your doorstep and disappear in the night. They are happy to sleep in your barn, and may have done so without your awareness.

Beat Bohemian
The Beat Bohemian: Reckless, raggedy, rambling, drifting, down-and-out, Utopia-seeking. It may seem like Beats suffer for their ideals, but they have let go of material desire...Beats are free spirits. They believe in freedom of expression. They travel light, but there is always a book or a notebook in their pocket...Beats jam, improvise, extemporize, blow ethereal notes into the universe, write poetry, ramble and wreck cars. They live on the edge of ideas. They take the part and then make up their own lines.

Zen Bohemian
The Zen Bohemian: No other Bohemians fathom the transient, green and meditative quality of life better than the Zens, even if they are in a rock band, which they often are. The Zen is post-Beat, a Bohemian whose quest has evolved from the artistic, smoky, literary and spiritually wanderlustful to the spiritually lustful.

Dandy Bohemian
The Dandy Bohemian: A little seedy, a little haughty, slightly shredded or threadbare, Dandies are the most polished of all Bohemians, even when their clothes are tattered. The Dandy aspires to old money without the money...You are more likely to find unpopular liqueurs such as Chartreuse and Earl Grey brandy in the Dandy home than a six-pack of Budweiser.

See also
 Bohemian style
 Flâneur

External links
 Official website

2004 non-fiction books
Bohemianism